Corridors and Parallels is an album by American jazz saxophonist David S. Ware which was recorded in 2001 and released on the AUM Fidelity label.

Reception

Ware's move to more electronic textures divided the critics. In his review for AllMusic, Sam Samuelson called it "his most inspired record thus far" and said "This recording is not to be missed". Pitchfork's Christopher Dare was less inpressed stating "I'll leave it to the listener to decide whether the good half of an album makes it worth the purchase. Unfortunately, the other half weakens all its supports with some tacky choices regarding sound palettes and dynamics-- deconstruction in the least clever sense". The Guardian's John Fordham noted "Much of it is as fiercely remorseless as you'd expect. But there are also Afro-funk grooves as tight as a club disc, endless tenor notes against gongs and bells, sci-fi electronic bleepings and twitterings, and an awe-inspiring tribute to Ware's late mother that is one of the most impassioned free-jazz tenor soliloquies of recent times". All About Jazz noted "This new effort is a fine record: a living document of a group in flux, and a stand-alone work of art. It will be quite revealing to hear what happens next after such a dramatic change. This is living, breathing music". Daniel Piotrowski wrote in JazzTimes that "Sometimes Corridors feels like an experiment in progress more than a cohesive idea, but it is still one of his most exciting and intriguing recordings".

The Wire placed the album in their "50 Records Of The Year 2001" list.

Track listing
All compositions by David S. Ware except as indicated
 "Untitled" - 1:20  
 "Straight Track" - 10:03  
 "Jazz Fi-Sci" - 4:22  
 "Superimposed" - 5:58  
 "Sound-a-Bye" - 3:09  
 "Untitled" - 0:37  
 "Corridors & Parallels" (Matthew Shipp, David S. Ware) - 9:00  
 "Somewhere" - 3:11  
 "Spaces Embraces" - 3:18  
 "Mother May You Rest in Bliss" - 6:08  
 "Untitled" - 1:48

Personnel
David S. Ware – tenor saxophone
Matthew Shipp – synthesizer
William Parker – bass
Guillermo E. Brown – drums

References

2001 albums
David S. Ware albums
AUM Fidelity albums